180 Degree Capital Corp. (f/k/a Harris & Harris Group) ("180") is a publicly traded registered closed-end management investment company.  180 was incorporated in 1981, and it completed an initial public offering (IPO) in 1983.  In March 2017, 180 changed its investment focus from investing in privately held companies to investing in microcapitalization publicly traded companies with a constructive activist approach.

References

External links
180 Degree Capital Corp. (company website)

Companies based in Essex County, New Jersey
American companies established in 1981
Companies listed on the Nasdaq
Montclair, New Jersey
1980s initial public offerings